Ora Lassila is a Finnish computer scientist who lives in the U.S. and works as a technologist at Amazon Web Services. He has been conducting research into the Semantic Web since 1996, and was co-author, with Tim Berners-Lee and James Hendler, of the article "The Semantic Web" which appeared in Scientific American in 2001, now the most cited paper in the Semantic Web area. His early work in this area included proposing the original RDF Specification with Ralph R. Swick and he has been an elected member of the World Wide Web Consortium (W3C) Advisory Board since 1998. He also belongs to the steering committee of the Semantic Web Science Association.

In 1996-1997, he was a visiting scientist at MIT Laboratory for Computer Science, working with W3C, and has also held positions at the Robotics Institute of Carnegie Mellon University, as a Research Scientist at the CS Laboratory of Helsinki University of Technology, and a research fellow at the Nokia Research Center in Cambridge, MA.

His work includes a frame-based Knowledge Representation system (dubbed "SCAM") that he developed (first at HUT and later at CMU) and which flew on board the NASA Deep Space 1 probe that passed the asteroid belt in 1999. The system served as the KR substrate for an on-board planner used in an experiment to have the probe perform its functions autonomously.

Bibliography
Programming Semantic Web Applications: A Synthesis of Knowledge Representation and Semi-Structured Data, dissertation, 2007

References

External links
 The original Resource Description Framework specifications, RDF Model and Syntax (1999 Recommendation) 
 The W3C Advisory Board 
 The Semantic Web Steering Committee
 Nokia Research Center
 Antics with Semantics: The Innovation Interview with Semantics Pioneer, Ora Lassila

Living people
Finnish computer programmers
Artificial intelligence researchers
Semantic Web people
Finnish expatriates in the United States
Year of birth missing (living people)